Cesare Benedetti (born 3 August 1987) is an Italian-born Polish professional road bicycle racer, who currently rides for UCI WorldTeam .

Career
Born in Rovereto, Benedetti has competed as a professional since 2010, competing for the  team since turning professional. He was also a member of the GS Gavardo Tecmor and De Nardi teams as an amateur, and also spent the second half of the 2009 season as a stagiaire with the  team.

Benedetti had been part of an eleven-rider breakaway at the start of the stage, but after 's Miguel Ángel Rubiano went clear, Benedetti remained with another three riders to the end of the stage.

He was named in the start list for the 2016 Tour de France and the 2016 Vuelta a España.

Benedetti took his first individual professional victory at stage 12 of the 2019 Giro d'Italia. Having been part of a 25-rider breakaway at the start of the stage, he took the stage win leading a small group sprint in a late comeback after having been dropped in the last hill climb.

Personal life
Benedetti's wife is Polish. He is fluent in Polish language and was granted Polish citizenship in April 2021.

During the 2021 season, Benedetti started competing under a Polish licence.

Major results

2005
 6th Overall Giro della Lunigiana
2007
 2nd Gran Premio Sportivi Podenzano
 3rd Trofeo Città di Brescia
 3rd Trofeo FTP Tapparo
 4th Gran Premio Industria Commercio Artigianato – Botticino
 4th Targa d'Oro Città di Legnano
 9th Gran Premio Palio del Recioto
2008
 1st Trofeo Edil C
 2nd Coppa Stignani
 2nd Trofeo Filtri
 3rd Milano–Busseto
 4th Coppa Caduti di Reda
 5th Trofeo G.S. Gavardo Tecmor
 5th Medaglia Oro Angelo Fumagalli
 9th GP Città di Felino
2009
 2nd Trofeo Banca Popolare di Vicenza
 3rd Gran Premio San Luigi
 6th Overall Girobio
 8th Città di Conegliano
 9th GP Inda
 10th Trofeo Eco del Chisone
2010
 1st Plombières
 8th Memorial Van Coningsloo
2011
 8th Overall Szlakiem Grodów Piastowskich
2012
 1st Stage 2b (TTT) Settimana Internazionale di Coppi e Bartali
2014
 9th Overall Tour of Qinghai Lake
2015
 Giro del Trentino
1st  Sprints classification
1st Stage 1 (TTT) 
2016
 1st  Mountains classification, Tirreno–Adriatico
 7th GP Industria & Artigianato di Larciano
 10th Rudi Altig Race
2017
 Giro d'Italia
Held  after Stage 1
2018
 3rd Overall Okolo Slovenska
2019
 1st Stage 12 Giro d'Italia

Grand Tour general classification results timeline

References

External links

Team NetApp profile

Italian male cyclists
1987 births
Living people
People from Rovereto
Sportspeople from Trentino
Italian Giro d'Italia stage winners
Polish male cyclists
Naturalized citizens of Poland
Cyclists from Trentino-Alto Adige/Südtirol